Trinity-Pawling School, founded in 1907, is an independent college and preparatory boarding school for boys from 7th grade to 12th grade. The 230 acre campus is situated in Pawling, New York, a small area in southern Dutchess County. It is located 60 miles north of New York City.

History 
Trinity-Pawling School was founded in 1907 by Frederick Luther Gamage, who had previously been headmaster of St. Paul's School. The first school building was Dutcher House, a building which had previously functioned as a hotel. Shortly after, George Bywater Cluett, who had previously donated money to Gamage for a gymnasium at St. Paul's, provided a larger grant for a new flagship building for the school that was then known as The Pawling School.

In 1910, it moved to its current location on Route 22, in a new building designed by New York City architect Grosvenor Atterbury – a building named Cluett Hall. The Pawling School was renamed Trinity-Pawling School in 1947.

One of Trinity-Pawling's first students was William Bradford Turner, a descendant of the first Massachusetts Bay Colony Governor William Bradford.  Turner was killed in action in World War I and was posthumously awarded the Medal of Honor.

Courses Offered: AP and Honors 
Advanced Placement Classes (20): Biology, Calculus (AB/ BC), English Literature & Composition, English Language & Composition, Chemistry, Computer Science A, Computer Science Principles, Economics (Micro/Macro), Environmental Science, European History, Music Theory, Physics (1, C: M, C: E/M), Statistics and U.S. History. Honors Classes (36): Advanced Art 1, Advanced Art 2, Advanced Art 3, Advanced Pre-calculus, Advanced Spanish, Advanced Spanish Literature, Advanced Spanish Language, Algebra 2, American Experience History, American Experience Literature, Biology, Calculus, Chemistry, Chinese 3, 4 and 5, Creation Modern World, English 1, English 2, French 3, 4 and 5, Geometry, Latin 3, 4 and 5, Latin Language and Literature 1 and 2, Modern World, Multi-Variable Calculus, Physics First, Spanish 2, 3, 4, 5 and Spanish Language & Culture.

Athletics 
The school has 13 varsity sports which compete against Founder's League and non-league foes. The Founder's League comprises T-P, Kent, Taft, Avon, Hotchkiss, Choate, Kingswood-Oxford, Loomis Chaffee, and Westminster. Girls' schools in the league are Ethel Walker and Miss Porter's.

In the fall, the boys compete in football, soccer and cross country. In the winter, the school offers wrestling, squash, skiing, hockey, and basketball. In the spring teams compete in track and field, baseball, tennis, golf, and lacrosse. There are lower teams for all of these sports, which routinely send players up to the varsity level.

Facilities include the Smith Field House and a new turf field lined for soccer, football, and lacrosse. The field house was named for former headmasters Archibald Smith and Phillips Smith. The field was dedicated to long-time football coach, Associate Headmaster, and Director of Studies David N. Coratti, in the fall of 2013. Additionally, nine new tennis courts were completed in 2013. Tirrell Rink was renovated in 2010. Facility updates and additions were provided by the generosity of Trinity-Pawling alumni.

The School offers six soccer fields, a newly refurbished basketball court (Hubbard Court), a newly refurbished weight room, and a new cardio room. The Rock Squash Courts opened in 1999, and the McGraw Wrestling Pavilion opened in 1998. The baseball field was renovated and named for Mo Vaughn, Class of 1986. An all-weather track was installed in 2006, and a grass football field remains in use on the west side of Route 22.

Fall 
 Cross country
 Soccer
 Football

Winter 
 Wrestling
 Hockey
 Ski team
 Squash
 Basketball

Spring 
 Track
 Lacrosse
 Baseball
 Golf
 Tennis

The Arts 
At Trinity-Pawling all the arts are under one roof. The Gardiner Arts Center had formerly been the school's gym from 1911 to 1960 and then used as an auditorium until 2002.

Clubs and activities 
There are 25-30 clubs and extracurricular activities offered to students each year. Some mainstays are Model UN, Diversity Club, Debate Club, Theater Tech Crew, Key Club (Admissions tour guides), and Film Club. Some more recent additions include Makers Club, fly-fishing club, and aviation club. Each student must participate in a club, program, or activity during their time at Trinity-Pawling.

Honor Code and Honor Council 
The Honor Council is a student organization.  Members are elected to the Honor Council by their peers and are responsible for upholding the Honor Code through personal example while also educating the student body in honorable behavior.  An honor pledge is signed by all students and faculty at the beginning of each academic year as follows:"Honesty and integrity live at the heart of the school. Behavior inspired by faith and virtue creates honor in the academic community and allows us to live by the principles of the Trinity-Pawling Honor Code: My efforts, preparations, and presentation are at all times honest."

Traditions 
 Each year the student body and faculty vote to name five to seven prefects to lead the student body. They are announced at the Stepping Up Ceremony, the School's internal graduation the day prior to Commencement.
 Dress Code: For Chapel, the boys dress in "Blues and Grays", consisting of a blue blazer, gray pants, white shirts, and usually a blue and gold tie. Recently, the boys have adopted the bow tie as a go-to for these events and often regular class days as well. Class Dress is a blazer, tie, and traditional khaki-style pants with shoes. Usually once a term there will be a dress down day to raise money for a charity or special cause. Neat Informal consists of a collared shirt with traditional khaki-style pants.
 Thanksgiving Dinner occurs the night before the last exam prior to break. Each faculty table enjoys a turkey dinner with all the fixings. The prefects judge the best faculty carving performance and give out several other humorous awards.
 Candlelight is the special Christmas/holiday celebration held on two occasions: one for the Pawling community and the other for the students, faculty, and their families. This is followed by a roast beef dinner.
 Headmaster's Holidays occur once per term. They allow the boys a night free of homework and the ability to sleep in the next day. Sports practices and evening study hall do take place to conclude the day.
School Prayer"O Spirit of Life, Wonderful Counselor: Let your presence in our midst make this school a fountain of wholesome activity and true knowledge: to her Trustees grant timely wisdom, to her Teachers the gift of inspiration, and to her Students a questing spirit; that soundness of learning, loftiness of character, and a capacity for gallant living may be furthered in this place from generation to generation; through Jesus Christ our Lord. Amen."Alma MaterPawling, hear thy sons who love thee Sing in worthy praise.Pledging to our Alma MaterLoyal hearts always.Faith and courage, thy foundations,Spread a-far thy fame:We revere thee, Alma MaterHonor'd be thy name.Green the fields on which we triumphed:Strong the friendships made.Sunset o’er the western hillsides;Pond in which we played.Blazer, tie, crest worn with honor,Boys now and always.Chapel bells rang out the hours, Cherish we those days.Those who go from out thy portals,Hallowed mem’ries bear,Of the days of earnest strivingFor thy glory there.Here we gather strong in spiritSinging joyfully,Ever steadfast in devotion,Pawling hail to thee!School HymnFor all the saints, who from their labors rest,Who thee by faith, before the world confessed,Thy Name, O Jesus, be forever blessed.Alleluia, alleluia.Thou wast their rock, their fortress, and their might:Thou, Lord, their Captain in the well fought fight;Thou, in the darkness drear, the one true Light.Alleluia, alleluia.O may thy soldiers, faithful, true, and bold,Fight as the saints, who nobly fought of old,And win, with them, the victor's crown of gold.Alleluia, alleluia.

Notable faculty 
Grieg Taber

Notable alumni 
 John Agar – actor
 Derek Dennis – football player
 Eric Drath – documentary director
 Sean Gleeson - Offensive coordinator and quarterbacks coach for Rutgers Scarlet Knights football.
 Gil Junger – director
 Kirk McCaskill – retired MLB pitcher, hockey player
 Kevin McClatchy – former CEO of the Pittsburgh Pirates
 Robert Montgomery – actor
 Frank Morgan – actor
 George Murphy – Academy Award-winning actor, president of the Screen Actors Guild, and United States Senator for California, 1964–1971
 Ian O'Boyle – athlete, basketball player, Manawatu Jets (NZ), Irish National team
 Chukky Okobi – NFL football player, Pittsburgh Steelers (2001–07, Super Bowl XL Champion)
 Wesley Oler – athlete, competed in the 1912 Summer Olympics
 Paul Rachman - American filmmaker
 Bob Rafelson - American film director
 Allison Whipple Rockefeller - American activist 
 Shayne Skov – athlete, linebacker, Stanford Cardinal team captain
 Charles Spencer – NFL player, Houston Texans
 William Bradford Turner Congressional Medal of Honor Recipient
 Maurice Vaughn – MLB first baseman, three-time All-Star, AL MVP
 David Von Ancken - American film, TV director, and screenwriter
 Leland Wilkinson - American statistician and computer scientist

References

External links 
 Trinity-Pawling School website
 The Association of Boarding Schools profile

1907 establishments in New York (state)
Boys' schools in the United States
Educational institutions established in 1907
Pawling, New York
Private high schools in Dutchess County, New York
Private middle schools in New York (state)
Boarding schools in New York (state)